Aída Mercedes Batlle Morell de Bonnelly ( Batlle Morell; July 28, 1909 – January 28, 2011) was a Dominican public figure and wife of former President Rafael Filiberto Bonnelly. She served as the First Lady of the Dominican Republic from January 18, 1962, to February 27, 1963. Battle was the great-granddaughter of Ulises Francisco Espaillat, another former Dominican president.

Biography
Aída Mercedes Batlle Morell was born on July 28, 1909, in the city of Santiago de los Caballeros. She was raised in a strict Catholic household. Her parents,  Juan Francisco Batlle Espaillat and Amelia Dolores Morell  Espaillat (who were second cousins), had married June 23, 1906, and had eight children (including Aida): Juan José, Daisy, Roberto, Tomás, Oscar, Víctor and Cosme.

Batlle received her bachelor's degree from the Normal School of Santiago, where her professors and instructors included Sergio Hernández, Joaquín Balaguer, and Rafael Filiberto Bonnelly. In 1930, Aida Mercedes Batlle married her former professor, Rafael Filiberto Bonnelly. The couple had four children -  Luisa Amelia, Rafael Francisco, Juan Sully, and Aida Mercedes.

Her husband was an opponent of the Rafael Trujillo dictatorship during the 1930s and early 1940s, leading to political persecution and economic hardship for the family. To earn income, Aida Mercedes Batlle established her own homemade ice cream business called "BB", which proved successful.

The family relocated to Santo Domingo in 1944, where Rafael Filiberto Bonnelly's political and civil service began to blossom. Bonnelly served as a government minister, dean of the University of Santo Domingo, and ambassador to Spain and Venezuela, during the 1940s and 1950s. He was appointed Vice President of the Dominican Republic from 1960 to 1960 under President Joaquín Balaguer following the assassination of Rafael Trujillo.

In 1962, Rafael Filiberto Bonnelly became President of the Dominican Republic and head of the Council of State. He notably organized the country's first free elections following the end of the 30-year Rafael Trujillo dictatorship. As a result, Aida Mercedes Batlle became the First Lady of the Dominican Republic from January 1962 to February 1963. While contemporary Dominican first ladies were not a visible in the early 1960s as they are today, First Lady Aida Mercedes Batlle spearheaded a number of public initiatives during her tenure. She primarily focused on social work and poverty alleviation. 

Batlle founded the Patronato de la Maternidad de Nuestra Señora de la Altagracia (Maternity Board of Our Lady of Altagracia), which helps pregnant women and their children. She also established Hogar Escuela Mercedes Amiama, a school which serves vulnerable Dominican young people. Aida Mercedes Batlle partnered with other women to expand social services in the Las Cañitas neighborhood, a historically underserved area of Santo Domingo.

Ex-President Rafael Filiberto Bonnelly died in December 1979, leaving Batlle a widow.

Former First Lady Aida Mercedes Batlle died at her home at 1:10 a.m. on January 28, 2011, at the age of 101. She was survived by her four children, fifteen grandchildren, thirty-six great-grandchildren, and one great-great-grandson. Her funeral viewing was held at the Blandino Funeral Home's La Paz Chapel on Abraham Lincoln Avenue in Santo Domingo later on January 28. Batlle was buried on January 19, 2011, in the Christ the Redeemer Cemetery (el Cementerio Cristo Redentor) in Santo Domingo.

References

1909 births
2011 deaths
First ladies of the Dominican Republic
Descendants of Ulises Espaillat
Dominican Republic centenarians
Women centenarians
People from Santiago de los Caballeros
People from Santo Domingo
White Dominicans